Gunahon Ka Devta  ( Deity of the Sins) is a 1967 Hindi-language drama film, produced and directed by Devi Sharma under the Janta Chitra banner. It stars Jeetendra, Rajshree  and music composed by Shankar Jaikishan.

Plot
Kundan, the pivot, is a lover of wine, women and gambling, yet he is a handsome young man of golden heart, forthright honesty and devil-may-care bravery. He falls head over heels for Kesar, a tom-boyish, upright and fearless girl of heroic heart, with the do-or-die decision. Kesar spurns him and her scorn for him intensifies the flames for love in his heart. Yet Kesar, with all the qualities of head and heart is a helpless have-not. She is unable to keep away the mercenary, wealthy and resourceful Lala Hakumat Rai, who is as old as her late father would have been, from the altar of marriage. Simultaneously, with the conquest of Kesar by marriage, Hakumat Rai for a large amount because of Diwan's determination to commit suicide on being told to do that by Kesar, whom he loved with the zeal of a Majnu. Kesar runs away from the altar on the eve of marriage and Kundan, just to save her from the clutches of Hakumat Rai, takes her to his home as his wife. Kesar poses as Kundan's wife under compulsion, because she hated the very sight of Hakumat Rai. She is welcomed by Kundan's old mother and the family. Yet Kesar refuses to be a wife to Kundan and he submits to her decision. He promises to protect her from villains till the man she loves arrives on the scene. Frustration in love drives Kundan further into the mire of nautch girls and to gambling dens. The agony of Kundan's mother and his family works on the mind of Kesar, who takes upon herself the onerous duty of lifting Kundan up from his world of sin and in her attempt to achieve her goal, she even takes her sight and goes blind. Hakumat Rai now strikes with the fury of a waiting hawk. He usurps the house of Kundan and drives his family out into the streets. He maneuvers to get Kundan arrested by the police and now Kesar, with a final attempt to save Kundan and his family, agrees to marry the wicked Lala, who is now all set to kill Diwan for his insurance money and grab the girl as well as the money. Just a day before the eventful marriage, Kundan is released. Now he has to decide whether he should continue to be a symbol of sin for the gratification of his senses, or a Devta, a symbol of service to his people.

Cast
 Jeetendra
 Rajshree
 Mehmood
 Randhir
 Asit Sen
 Jankidas
 Jeevan
 Leela Chitnis
 Aruna Irani
 Sujata Rubener
 Tun Tun
 Farida

Soundtrack

References

External links 
 

Films scored by Shankar–Jaikishan
1960s Hindi-language films
1967 drama films
1967 films